Ron King (born July 11, 1951) is a retired American basketball player.  He played for the Kentucky Colonels in the American Basketball Association (ABA).

A 6'4" shooting guard from Louisville, Kentucky, was Kentucky Mr. Basketball as a senior at Central High School.  He chose Florida State for college, where as a junior he led the Seminoles to the 1972 National Championship game, where they lost to UCLA 81–76.  King scored 1,252 points in his college career (19.6 per game) and set the school single-game scoring record with 46 against Georgia Southern on February 11, 1971.

After graduation, King was drafted by the Golden State Warriors in the fourth round (63rd pick overall) of the 1973 NBA draft.  He signed instead with the Kentucky Colonels of the ABA, playing one season and averaging 7.1 points per game in the 1973–74 season.

References

External links
College stats at Nolefan.org

1951 births
Living people
American expatriate basketball people in Israel
American men's basketball players
Basketball players from Louisville, Kentucky
Florida State Seminoles men's basketball players
Golden State Warriors draft picks
Kentucky Colonels draft picks
Kentucky Colonels players
Shooting guards